Sam Hunter may refer to:

People
Sam Hunter (art historian) (1923–2014), American historian of modern art
Sam Hunter (cartoonist) (1858–1939), Canadian cartoonist
Samuel Hunter (gymnast) (born 1988), British male artistic gymnast
Samuel D. Hunter (playwright)  (born 1981), American playwright

Fictional
Sam Hunter (TV series), an American television drama series
Sam Hunter (EastEnders), a fictional character
Sam Hunter, a character in Hunted and Sam Hunter

See also 
Samuel Hunter (disambiguation)

Hunter, Sam